Abbasov is a masculine surname, commonly found in Azerbaijani-language. The female counterpart name is Abbasova. It is a slavicised version of Arabic male given name Abbas with addition of the suffix -ov. People with this surname include:

 Ali Abbasov (born 1953), Minister of Information and Communication Technology, Azerbaijan
 Ashraf Abbasov (1920-1992), Azerbaijani composer 
 Aykhan Abbasov, Azerbaijani footballer
 Azat Abbasov (1925–2006), operatic tenor
 Farid Abbasov, Azerbaijani chess grandmaster
 Idrak Abbasov (born c. 1976), Azerbaijani journalist 
 Ismat Abbasov, Minister of Agriculture, Azerbaijan
 Mahyaddin Abbasov, Azerbaijani journalist
 Ramazan Abbasov, Azerbaijani footballer
 Ruslan Abbasov, Azerbaijani sprint athlete
 Samir Abbasov, Azerbaijani footballer
 Tamilla Abbasova (born 1982), Russian racing cyclist 
 Tarana Abbasova (born 1967), Azerbaijani female weightlifter
 Tural Abbasov (born 1990), Azerbaijani swimmer
 Urfan Abbasov (born 1992), Azerbaijani footballer 

Patronymic surnames
Azerbaijani-language surnames
Surnames from given names